Lophyra is a genus of tiger beetles in the family Cicindelidae capable of flight. It contains the following species:

 Lophyra abbreviata (Klug, 1832)
 Lophyra alba (W.Horn, 1894)
 Lophyra albens (W.Horn, 1895)
 Lophyra anataria Naviaux, 1991
 Lophyra arnoldi (W.Horn, 1904)
 Lophyra atkinsonii (Gestro, 1893)
 Lophyra barbifrons (Boheman, 1848)
 Lophyra bertolonia (W.Horn, 1915)
 Lophyra boreodilatata (W.Horn, 1929)
 Lophyra bouyeriana Cassola, 2005
 Lophyra brevicollis (Wiedemann, 1823)
 Lophyra canaliculata Werner, 1993
 Lophyra cancellata (Dejean, 1825)
 Lophyra candida (Dejean, 1825)
 Lophyra capillata Werner & Wiesner, 1994
 Lophyra cassoliana Werner, 1997
 Lophyra catena (Fabricius, 1775)
 Lophyra cerina Naviaux & Acciavatti, 1987
 Lophyra clathrata (Dejean, 1825)
 Lophyra damara (Peringuey, 1892)
 Lophyra differens (W.horn, 1892)
 Lophyra endroedyi Cassola, 1993
 Lophyra escheri (Dejean, 1831)
 Lophyra fasciculicornis (Barker, 1919)
 Lophyra flavipennis Cassola, 1983
 Lophyra flexuosa (Fabricius, 1787)
 Lophyra fuliginosa (Dejean, 1826)
 Lophyra gemina (W.Horn, 1927)
 Lophyra grossepunctata (W.Horn, 1913)
 Lophyra herero (Peringuey, 1892)
 Lophyra hilariola (Bates, 1874)
 Lophyra histrio (Tschitscherine, 1903)
 Lophyra infuscatula (W.Horn, 1915)
 Lophyra juengeriorum (Mandl, 1973)
 Lophyra kuznetzowi (Tscherkasov, 1992)
 Lophyra latelimbata (G.Muller, 1941)
 Lophyra lefroyi (W.Horn, 1908)
 Lophyra lineifrons (Chaudoir, 1865)
 Lophyra luxerii (Dejean, 1831)
 Lophyra minax (Wallengren, 1881)
 Lophyra miskelliana Cassola, 1986
 Lophyra monteiroi (Bates, 1878)
 Lophyra multiguttata (Dejean, 1825)
 Lophyra murzini Werner, 1992
 Lophyra namibica Werner & Wiesner, 1994
 Lophyra neglecta (Dejean, 1825)
 Lophyra nitidipes (Wallengren, 1881)
 Lophyra nudorestricta (W.Horn, 1913)
 Lophyra obliquograciliaenea (W.Horn, 1920)
 Lophyra obtusidentata (Putzeys, 1880)
 Lophyra parvimaculata (Fowler, 1912)
 Lophyra persicola (W.Horn, 1934)
 Lophyra praetermissa Cassola, 2008
 Lophyra pseudodistans (W.Horn, 1939)
 Lophyra pseudominax Wiesner, 2001
 Lophyra pseudoneglecta Miskell, 1978
 Lophyra quadraticollis (Chaudoir, 1835)
 Lophyra reliqua (Barker, 1920)
 Lophyra roberti Werner, 2003
 Lophyra rufidorsalis Miskell, 1978
 Lophyra saraliensis (Guerin-Meneville, 1849)
 Lophyra senegalensis (Dejean, 1825)
 Lophyra somalia (Fairmaire, 1882)
 Lophyra striatifrons (Chaudoir, 1852)
 Lophyra striolata (Illiger, 1800)
 Lophyra sumlini Cassola, 1976
 Lophyra tetradia (Fairmaire, 1899)
 Lophyra uncivittata (Quedenfeldt, 1883)
 Lophyra vittigera (Dejean, 1825)
 Lophyra vittula Rivalier, 1951
 Lophyra vivida (Boheman, 1848)
 Lophyra wajirensis Miskell, 1978
 Lophyra wellmani (W.Horn, 1907)
 Lophyra wiesneriana Cassola, 1983

References

External links

Cicindelidae